Kate Dempsey (born 25 March 1995) is an Australian rules footballer playing for the Richmond Football Club in the AFL Women's (AFLW). Dempsey was drafted by Richmond with the club's tenth selection and the 84th pick overall in the 2019 AFL Women's draft. She made her debut against  at Robertson Oval in Wagga Wagga in round 5 of the 2020 season.

Statistics
Statistics are correct to the end of the 2021 season.

|- style="background-color: #eaeaea"
! scope="row" style="text-align:center" | 2020
|style="text-align:center;"|
| 19 || 1 || 0 || 0 || 7 || 3 || 10 || 6 || 4 || 0.0 || 0.0 || 7.0 || 3.0 || 10.0 || 6.0 || 4.0
|- 
|- style="background:#EAEAEA"
| scope="row" text-align:center | 2021
| 
| 19 || 9 || 0 || 0 || 81 || 30 || 111 || 20 || 15 || 0.0 || 0.8 || 9.0 || 3.3 || 12.3 || 2.2 || 1.7
|-
|- class="sortbottom"
! colspan=3| Career
! 10
! 0
! 0
! 88
! 33
! 121
! 26
! 19
! 0.0
! 0.0
! 8.8
! 3.3
! 12.1
! 2.6
! 1.9
|}

References

External links

1995 births
Living people
Richmond Football Club (AFLW) players
Australian rules footballers from Victoria (Australia)